Cahill (or ) is a name of Irish origin. It is the anglicised version of the Gaelic "Ó Cathail" meaning "descendant of Cathal".

"Cathal" consists of two parts: "cath" means battle; the second could be "val" (rule), so that the name as a whole meant "battle ruler" or "strong in battle", or it could be "all" (great), so that the name as a whole meant "great warrior".

People with the surname 

Notable people with the surname include:
 Barry Cahill (actor) (1921–2012), Canadian-born actor
Kymba Cahill (radio announcer) (born 1980) Australian radio announcer 
 Barry Cahill (Gaelic footballer) (born 1981), Irish Gaelic football player
 Bernard J.S. Cahill (1866–1944), American architect and cartographer
 Brendan J. Cahill (born 1963), American catholic bishop
 Charles Cahill (ice hockey) (1904–1954), Canadian ice hockey player
 Charles Cahill (rugby league) (1916–2007), Australian rugby league footballer and coach
 Christina Cahill (née Boxer, born 1957), British middle-distance athlete
 Darren Cahill (born 1965), Australian tennis player and coach
 Eddie Cahill (born 1978), American actor
 Edward Cahill (priest) (1868–1941), Irish Jesuit priest and academic
 Edward Cahill (pianist) (1885–1975), Australian concert pianist
 Edward Cahill (jurist) (1843–1922), justice of the Michigan Supreme Court in 1890
 Emmet Cahill (born 1990), Irish tenor, member of Celtic Thunder
 Erin Cahill (born 1980), American actress
 Frank S. Cahill (1876–1934), Canadian politician
 Gary Cahill (born 1985), English football player
 George F. Cahill (1869–1935), American inventor
 Holger Cahill (1887–1960), Icelandic-American Director of the US Federal Art Project
 Horace T. Cahill (1894–1976), American politician; Lieutenant Governor of Massachusetts 1939–1945
 Jackie Cahill (born 1957), Irish politician
 James Cahill (art historian) (1926–2014), American art historian
 James Cahill (snooker player), (born 1995) English snooker player
 James F. Cahill (1926–2008), American scuba diving pioneer, one of the first Navy Seals
 Joe Cahill (1920–2004), Irish republican and IRA leader
 John Cahill (footballer) (born 1940), Australian rules football player and coach
 John Baptist Cahill (1841–1910), English Roman Catholic Bishop of Portsmouth
 John T. Cahill (lawyer) (1903–66), American lawyer and prosecutor
 Joseph Cahill (1891–1959), Australian politician, Premier of New South Wales 1952–1959
 Josh Cahill (born 1986), German-Czech aviation vlogger
 Julie McNally Cahill (born 1966), creator of Gym Partner and Littlest Pet Shop
 Keenan Cahill (born 1995), teenager known for viral video 
 Kevin A. Cahill (born 1955), American politician from New York; state representative
 Leo Cahill (born 1928), American professional football coach 
 Lily Cahill (1888–1955), American actress 
 Mabel Cahill (1863–1905), Irish championship tennis player
 Máiría Cahill (born 1981), Irish politician
 Marie Cahill (1866–1933), Broadway stage actress
 Martin Cahill (1949–1994), Irish criminal
 Mary Beth Cahill (born 1954), American political figure, campaign manager for John Kerry
 Michael T. Cahill, Dean of Brooklyn Law School
 Mike Cahill (tennis) (born 1952), American tennis player
 Mike Cahill (director) (born 1979), American filmmaker
 Ollie Cahill (born 1975), Irish professional football player
 Pat Cahill (born 1949), Texas High School football coach
 Patricia Cahill (drug smuggler) (born 1973), British teen, imprisoned in Thailand
 Patricia Cahill (singer) (born 1945), Irish singer
 Pearse Cahill (1917–2011), Irish aviation pioneer
 Richard Cahill (fl. 1911–1912), English professional football player
 Richard T. Cahill Jr. (born 1971), American author of Hauptmann's Ladder (on Lindbergh kidnapping)
 Robert Ellis Cahill (1934–2005), American author
 Ronnie Cahill (born 1915), American football player
 Rowan Cahill (born 1945), Australian historian and journalist
 Sally Cahill (contemporary), Canadian voice actor and screen actress
 Sarah Cahill (model) (born 1978), American beauty queen and model
 Sarah Cahill (pianist) (born 1960), American pianist, writer and radio host
 Ted Cahill (rugby league) (fl. 1950s), English rugby player
 Thaddeus Cahill (1867–1934), inventor of the telharmonium
 Thomas Cahill (born 1940), American scholar and writer
 Thomas Cahill (bishop) (1913–1978), Australian Roman Catholic bishop
 Thomas Cahill (soccer) (1864–1951), American soccer coach
 Tim Cahill (born 1979), Australian soccer player
 Tim Cahill (writer) (born 1943), American travel writer and magazine editor
 Tim Cahill (producer) (born 1966), creator of Gym Partner and Littlest Pet Shop
 Timothy P. Cahill (born 1959), American politician from Massachusetts; state treasurer
 Tom Cahill (American football) (1919–1992), football player and coach
 Tom Cahill (Australian politician) (1924–1983), Australian politician from New South Wales
 Trevor Cahill (born 1988), American baseball player
 William T. Cahill (1912–1996), American politician from New Jersey; US Representative
 Dennis R. Cahill (1939-2016), American High School Biology Teacher and coach from Eureka, Humboldt County, California
 Jan Cahill, A screwess in Walton who happens to be married to a large galute (to quote Wayne Waring)

Fictional characters
 Amy Cahill, Dan Cahill, Grace Cahill, Hope Cahill, Beatrice Cahill, Fiske Cahill, James Cahill, Henry Cahill, Olivia Cahill, Gideon Cahill, Luke Cahill, Katherine Cahill, Thomas Cahill, Jane Cahill, and Madeleine Cahill in The 39 Clues.
 Red Cahill, character in the In The Heat of the Night second-season episode "Walkout"
 J.D. Cahill, title character in the 1973 movie Cahill U.S. Marshal
 Alex Cahill, character in Walker, Texas Ranger
 Dr. Cahill, character in Futurama
 Jordan Cahill, character from Stuck in the Suburbs played by Taran Killam

External links
 Cahill at irishsurnames.com

Entertainment
 Cahill (band), a dance-music group based in Liverpool, UK

See also 
 McCahill

References 

Surnames of Irish origin